The 1998–99 Munster Rugby season was Munster's fourth season as a professional team, during which they competed in the IRFU Interprovincial Championship and Heineken Cup. It was Declan Kidney's first season in his first spell as head coach of the province.

1998–99 squad

Friendlies

1998–99 IRFU Interprovincial Championship

1998–99 Heineken Cup

Pool 2

Quarter-final

References

External links
1998–99 Munster Rugby season official site 
1998–99 Munster Rugby Heineken Cup

1998–99
1998–99 in Irish rugby union
1998–99 Heineken Cup